Television in Bulgaria was introduced in 1959. Global players such as News Corporation, Modern Times Group, Central European Media Enterprises, Fox Broadcasting Company and others operate the biggest and most popular media outlets in the country.

Terrestrial 

In 1954, a team at the Machine and Electrotechnics Institute in Sofia (today called the Technical University of Sofia) started experimental television broadcasting with two antennas (one for sound and one for image) on the roof of a building near the Vasil Levski monument in the city, after having previously conducted successful cable test transmissions.  These experimental broadcasts aroused the interest of the Ministry of Communications, which decided to build a broadcasting tower in Sofia, with a state-controlled channel to air from it. The new channel started with an unofficial broadcast on 1 November 1959, and made its first official broadcast several days later with the live coverage of the 7 November manifestation, commemorating the Russian Revolution of 1917. The experimental channel of the MEI did not air anything but a test chart on that day, although it did show a greeting to the new Sofia Television Station three times after 19:05. The MEI channel continued to operate until late 1960, when the team started working on the future introduction of color television.

The new channel, later referred to as "Bulgarian Television" (BT) used the OIRT standard of 625 lines and 25 frames per second. It also used the D/K audio system, which was generally done to prevent reception of Western European stations in Eastern Bloc countries. Public attention was quickly caught by the new medium, and the number of bought and registered television sets increased gradually. In 1960, a powerful 20 kilowatt transmitter was installed at Botev Peak, covering a large area of the country. Later, more transmitters and retranslators were placed in various cities, towns and villages around the country.

Programming was controlled and influenced by the Bulgarian Communist Party-run government in this time, as was usual in the Eastern Bloc. The first popular program were the news, which were titled "Around the World and at Home" ("По света и у нас", with "at home" meaning in this case "in our country"), a name which is used to this day. The news' trademark "spinning globe" opening, first animated in 1961, is also still used (albeit highly modified). Other popular shows started around this time were the children's block "Good Night, Children" ("Лека нощ, деца", still in use), television theatre programs, the various sport events which were broadcast live from around the world, and music programs like the regular New Year celebration shows. Foreign programming in the early years was limited to mostly Soviet Union productions, as well as some direct rebroadcasts of Soviet television programming.

In 1972, the first color broadcast was made, again of a manifestation. The SECAM color system was used, because PAL was used in most western countries (except for France, where SECAM was invented). After several years, the entire programming was broadcast in color.

In 1974, the second channel of the Bulgarian Television was launched, with the original channel being called simply "first channel". Later, they were given on-screen logos and were named "BT1" ("БТ 1") and "BT2" ("БТ 2"). In the late 1980s, some western programming was allowed, including Pink Panther cartoons and the television series La piovra (Октопод) and Escrava Isaura (Робинята Изаура). Ivan Garelov's Panorama and Kevork Kevorkyan's Vsyaka nedelya talk shows/news magazines were among BT's most popular programs. With the fall of the communist rule in 1989, the two channels changed dramatically. They started airing a lot of US films and TV series, one of the first being The Flintstones (Семейство Флинтстоун). Their names were also changed, BT 1 became Kanal 1 (Channel1) (Канал 1) and BT 2 became Efir 2. The television organisation's name was changed to Bulgarian National Television. In the 1990s, BNT changed the color television system to PAL, while keeping compatibility with older TV sets by using the DK audio standard (on such sets, only black-and-white picture is seen). Efir 2's frequencies were sold in 2000 to News Corporation for the country's first over-the-air national channel: bTV. In 2008, Channel 1 was again renamed to BNT 1. The second programme started again in 2011 under the name BNT 2. It merged the regional BNT programmes.

Privately owned television channels started to appear immediately after the regime change. Most were associated with a cable television (CATV) network run by the same parent company. Around 1994-1995 private over-the-air broadcasters also appeared, but they usually only operated within a single area. Nova Television and 7 Dni TV (7 дни, meaning 7 days) were two of the first such channels, available only in Sofia. After bTV took over Efir 2's frequencies, another competition selected Nova Television, already popular in cable networks around the country, as the second privately owned national channel in Bulgaria. The authorities currently refuse to license further analogue terrestrial channels (including local ones), until DVB-T broadcasting is started.

Digital terrestrial television in Bulgaria

The Bulgarian Telecommunications Company provided one experimental DVB-T transponder in Sofia since 2004.
First regular digital broadcast started on 1 March 2013, with a plan to terminate analog broadcasting on 1 September 2013.
The Simulcast period (time between digital broadcast switch-on and analog broadcast switch-off) allowed people time to buy new integrated Digital TVs or set-top boxes. Standards chosen are DVB-T and MPEG4 AVC/H.264 compression format, while DVB-T2 would not be used for now.
On 30 September 2013, the analog broadcasting was officially terminated, leaving the country with 96,2% of the population DVB-T broadcasting coverage.

Cable 

Cable television (CATV) in Bulgaria appeared in the early 1990s, with some of the earliest networks starting operation in 1991 and 1992.  Satellite channels from other countries were one of the main features of cable television at the time and in the following years channels like Cartoon Network Europe, MTV European and Discovery Channel became very popular, as more people subscribed to the (relatively cheap) cable TV operators. Many (if not all) cable companies created their own television channels, which were available only to their subscribers. Due to technical limitations, it was initially difficult for such channels to be distributed to other populated places in the country, but in the late 90s several channels started to appear in the entire country using Bulgarian Telecommunications Company cables as the distribution method. In 1998, M SAT (then known as Mustang Sat) became the first Bulgarian channel available via satellite. The local terrestrial channel Nova Television from Sofia became available all over the country in 1999 using cable transmission. Around 2000–2001, some foreign broadcasters such as Discovery Channel and the Hallmark Channel (now DIVA Universal started Bulgarian translations of their channels using DVB subtitles. Currently, most cable networks carry a large selection of local and foreign channels, both translated and untranslated. Translation of foreign networks has since expanded from subtitles to voice dubbing, with channels like AXN and Jetix (formerly Fox Kids) (now Disney Channel) having a Bulgarian audio track.

Analogue broadcasting is still used by operators, and it was the only method used before 2004–2005. Since then, many of them started lowering the number of analogue channels in order to launch DVB-C transponders. However, because the monthly fee for the digital packages is higher, some subscribers choose to continue using the analogue service, although with less channels than before. Currently, the biggest cable operators provide DVB-C channels in the major cities and towns. As of 2009, analogue channels are usually the only service available in villages.

Satellite 
Satellite channels from Bulgaria appeared prior to the existence of a DTH operator. The first channel to start broadcasting via satellite was MSAT (then known as Mustang Sat, after parent company Mustang) in 1998, operating from Varna. Before this, the Mustang channel was distributed through cable lines, maintained by the Bulgarian Telecommunications Company. The following year, the Bulgarian National Television launched a special channel, TV Bulgaria (now known as BNT World), dedicated to Bulgarians living abroad. Several other channels followed, including the musical channel MM.

Then, in 2003, Bulsatcom became the first Bulgarian DTH operator, offering initially a limited amount of channels on Hellas Sat 2. The next year, ITV Partner (now Satellite BG) was launched as a DTH service by Interactive Technologies PLC, broadcasting on Eutelsat W2. Both supply DVB-S satellite television in Bulgaria and most European countries, with some of the TV channels using the two DTH operators as their main distribution medium (so that the channels are easily available to cable operators without the use of long-distance wires). The second half of 2010 saw the long anticipated launch of the third Bulgarian DTH provider, operated by Bulgaria's Vivacom.  There is also a small package operated by Telenor on Thor 3, which has for a long time distributed certain Bulgarian TV and radio channels.

Generally, Bulgarian television companies do not require a high fee for their channels' availability to viewers (some have no fee at all), but because of licensing restrictions of foreign programming, most satellite channels are encrypted, so that distribution outside Bulgaria can be limited. Free-to-view channels carry less (or none at all) such programming, airing for example music or locally produced programs only. Currently, most channels that broadcast nationally are available via satellite.

List of television channels

Terrestrial (free-to-air channels with national coverage) 
 BNT 1, state-owned TV network
 BNT 2; state-owned TV network
 BNT 3, state-owned TV network
 Nova Television, TV network, used former analogue frequencies of Soviet television networks TV Ostankino and ORT
 bTV; TV network, used former analogue frequencies of BNT's defunct second channel Efir 2
 Bulgaria ON AIR, part of the Investor.BG group of channels

Pay television 
Bloomberg TV Bulgaria
TV+
TVart
  (operated by the Bulgarian military)
Balkanika TV
City TV
E-Kids
Code Health TV
Code Fashion TV
VTV
Box TV
Fan TV
Folklor TV
F+
Film+
Sport+
HD+
Hobby TV
BG TOP Music
Vivacom Arena
Planeta TV
Planeta Folk
Planet Fun
Rodina TV
SKAT
Travel HD
The Voice
Travel TV
Community TV
Euronews Bulgaria (Formerly TV Europa)
7/8 TV

Foreign channels translated into Bulgarian 

Channels marked with an asterisk (*) have a Bulgarian audio channel, all others have Bulgarian subtitles only
Channels marked with an plus (+) are broadcasting in HD

Animal Planet+
FOX Crime*+
FOX Life*+
FOX*+
AXN*
AXN Black*
AXN White*
Cinemax*+
Cinemax 2*+
Discovery Channel*+
Discovery Science+
Investigation Discovery*+
TLC*
Eurosport*+
Eurosport 2*+
HBO*+
HBO 2 (ex HBO Comedy)*+
HBO 3 *+
National Geographic Channel*+
National Geographic Wild*+
Travel Channel (UK)*+
TV1000+
Viasat Nature+ (as Viasat History/Nature HD)
Viasat History+ (as Viasat History/Nature HD)
Viasat Explorer*
Fine Living Network
CBS Reality
Disney Channel*+ (its broadcasting in HD only as on demand)
Cartoon Network*+ (its broadcasting in HD only as on demand)
Nickelodeon*+ (its broadcasting in HD only as on demand)
Nicktoons*+ (its broadcasting in HD only as on demand)
Nick Jr.*+ (its broadcasting in HD only as on demand)

Most viewed channels
Source: Nielsen Admosphere Bulgaria, December 2022

See also 
 List of Bulgarian television shows

References

External links 
 History of television in Bulgaria
 Council for Electronic Media of Bulgaria
 Communications Regulation Commission of Bulgaria

 
Bulgaria
Television stations